The Grand Hotel Rimini is a five star-hotel located in Rimini, Italy.
It is known for its elegance, classic style, and association with the famous Italian filmmaker, Federico Fellini. 

It is the only five-star hotel in the city, as well as the only hotel on the coast with its own private beach; consequently it is very popular during the summer season.

History

The hotel was designed by the South American architect, Paolo Somazzi. It was inaugurated on July 1, 1908 and continues to function as a hotel today.

A serious fire destroyed the two decorative domes which adorned the roof in July 1920: the domes were never replaced. The hotel, badly damaged during the war, was reconstructed in the 1950s. 

In 1994 the Grand Hotel Rimini was recognized as a national monument and it is under the protection of the Superintendent of Fine Arts. Next to the Grand Hotel, stands the Conference Centre. Built in 1992 and equipped with state-of-the-art technological equipment, it is open all year long to host meetings and conferences at national and international level.

After a few management changes along the years, in 1992 the Grand Hotel Rimini was taken over by Chiacig Advance Hotel, a young hotel management company founded by three families (The Chiacig family from Udine, with Alfredo Chiacig as main founder, The Jannotta family from Castione della Presolana-Bergamo and the Bernardi family from Rimini). Today, the Grand Hotel Rimini belongs to the new brand Exclusive Hotels of Italy and for many years Grand Hotel Rimini, was a main sponsor for Mens Sana Basket or better known as Montepaschi Siena.

Style
One of the most attractive aspects of the Grand Hotel is its classic style.
The rooms are still decorated with Venetian and French antiques of the 18th century, and the original wooden floor (parquet) and Venetian chandeliers have been restored. In the restaurant and the other banqueting rooms, the furniture, the paintings, and the lights, reinforce the original atmosphere of the past. 

However it also has a second building across the street, called the Residenza, where there are modern-style rooms.

Federico Fellini

The hotel became world-famous through Federico Fellini's films. As a poor child growing up in Rimini, he often looked through the gates of the hotel in awe, dreaming of a life of luxury like the hotel's guests. These childhood memories inspired some of his most successful films. The Grand Hotel is featured particularly in his film Amarcord, where it is in the background of some of the film's most memorable scenes. 

Fellini himself loved to be a guest at the Grand Hotel once he was successful, and stayed in his favourite suite on a regular basis. Today, some guests specifically request to stay in that room. It was actually in this room, while talking on the phone, where he had the collapse that ultimately led to his death. The friend he was talking to on the phone heard a sudden silence from the other end, and called the Grand Hotel back immediately to ask them to check to see if Fellini was alright. They found him lying on the floor, and he was rushed to hospital. He later died in Rome.

External links
 
 
 Great Hotels of the World

Hotels in Italy
Buildings and structures in Rimini
Tourist attractions in Emilia-Romagna
Hotels established in 1908
Hotel buildings completed in 1908